"Let's kill all the lawyers" is a line from William Shakespeare's Henry VI, Part 2, Act IV, Scene 2. The full quote is: "The first thing we do, let's kill all the lawyers". It is among Shakespeare's most famous lines, as well as one of his most controversial.

Analysis 
Shakespeare may be making a joke when the character "Dick The Butcher" suggests one of the ways the band of pretenders to the throne can improve the country is to kill all the lawyers.  Dick is a rough character like the other henchmen, a killer as evil as his name implies, and this is his rough solution to his perceived societal problem.  

The line has been interpreted in different ways: criticism of how lawyers maintain the privilege of the wealthy and powerful; implicit praise of how lawyers stand in the way of violent mobs; and criticism of bureaucracy and perversions of the rule of law.

Text

References 

Shakespearean phrases
Lawyers